Chainsaw carving competitions are competitive events held all over the world where contestants display their skills in the act of chainsaw carving.

Australia
Australian Chainsaw Carving Championship, Melbourne

Canada
Chetwynd (International) Chainsaw Carving Competition (Championship), Chetwynd, British Columbia held annually since 2005
Brigade Days/Hope Chainsaw Carving Competition, Hope, British Columbia, biannually
Prince George Chain Saw Carving Competition, Prince George, British Columbia

Japan
Tōei, Aichi, since 2001

United Kingdom
Carve Carrbridge, Carrbridge, Scotland, held annually since 2003
English Open Chainsaw Carving Competition, Tatton Park, Cheshire, England, since 2005

United States

Alaska
Seldovia Craft Invitational Chainsaw Competition, Seldovia, Alaska, annually since 2006

Montana
Kootenai Country Montana International Chainsaw Carving Championship, Libby, Montana,

Oregon
Reedsport Chainsaw Carving Competition/Oregon Divisional Chainsaw Sculpting Championship, Reedsport, Oregon, held annually since 2000

Pennsylvania
Chainsaw Carvers Rendezvous, Ridgway, Pennsylvania, held annually since 2000

Washington
Burning Bear, Ocean City, Washington
Sedro Woolley Logger-Rodeo (Loggerodeo), Sedro Woolley, Washington, since before 1999
Sequim Irrigation Fest, Sequim, Washington, featuring Logging Show since 1989
Sand and Sawdust, Ocean Shores, Washington
Texas Chainsaw Pumpkin Carving Contest, Fremont Oktoberfest in Seattle since before 2005, draws 30,000 spectators

Wisconsin
US Open Chainsaw Sculpture Championship, Eau Claire, Wisconsin

References

Chainsaw